Schloss Philippsburg is the name of:

 Schloss Philippsburg (Braubach) in Braubach, Rhineland-Palatinate, Germany
 Schloss Philippsburg (Koblenz), former schloss in Koblenz-Ehrenbreitstein, Rhineland-Palatinate, Germany
 Schloss Philippsburg (Niederwürzbach),  former schloss in Blieskastel-Niederwürzbach, Saarland, Germany
 Schloss Philippsburg (Philippsbourg), former schloss in Philippsbourg, Moselle, France